Carlisle House is a historic home located at Milford, Sussex County, Delaware.  It was built in 1794, and is a two-story, five bay, frame building with a gable roof with dormers.  It has a two-story rear wing and two side wings; one a conservatory and the other a garage. It has a pent roof across the front with a pedimented entrance hood supported by paired Doric order columns.  The house was built by a ship's carpenter, David West, and is one of the last surviving artifacts from a once prosperous shipbuilding industry.

It was added to the National Register of Historic Places in 1982.

References

Houses on the National Register of Historic Places in Delaware
Houses completed in 1794
Houses in Milford, Delaware
Houses in Sussex County, Delaware
National Register of Historic Places in Sussex County, Delaware
1794 establishments in the United States